Björn Theodor Björnsson (September 3, 1922 – August 25, 2007) was an Icelandic writer born in Reykjavík. He attended the University of London, University of Edinburgh, and the University of Copenhagen. He was President of the Icelandic writers union for a time. He was married to an artist, Ásgerður Búadóttir, and has written several popular historical novels.

See also 

 List of Icelandic writers
 Icelandic literature

External links
Iceland literature site

1922 births
2007 deaths
Bjorn Th. Bjornsson
Icelandic expatriates in the United Kingdom
Icelandic expatriates in Denmark